Amaryllis was a catamaran sailboat designed by Nathanael Greene Herreshoff and launched in 1876. It was notable for its significant victory in the 1876 New York Centennial Regatta, which resulted in multihull sailing vessels being banned from organized sailing competitions. Ironically, Herreshoff was later to become a celebrated monohull designer.

Amaryllis was succeeded by a second catamaran vessel, Tarantella.

It is said that prejudice against multihulls resulting from Amarayllis' superior performance was only overcome by Victor Tchetchet much later in 1946.

See also
List of multihulls
Victor Tchetchet

References

Individual catamarans
1876 ships
Sailboat type designs by Nathanael Greene Herreshoff